Lynni Treekrem (born 26 December 1958) is a Norwegian singer and composer.

She was born in Seattle, Washington, US, and grew up in Kristiansund. Her album Haugtussa from 1995 earned her Spellemannprisen. Among her other albums are Storm  from 1997, and Sweethearts from 2004.

References

1958 births
Living people
Musicians from Seattle
Musicians from Kristiansund
American emigrants to Norway
Norwegian women singers
Norwegian composers
Spellemannprisen winners